The Peckett W4 class is a class of 0-4-0 ST steam locomotives built by Peckett and Sons at the Atlas Works factory in Bristol, England from 1885 to 1906. 140 Peckett W4 locomotives were built in total, and they were part of a family of six W-class locomotive engines (W2 through W7), which featured cylinders  in diameter.

The more notable Peckett and Sons customers (and the number of locomotives they purchased) included Manchester Ship Canal (3), Ebbw Vale Steelworks (2), and Huntley and Palmers (1).

Models
In October 2015, the British model railway brand Hornby Railways announced that it would make a OO gauge model of the Pecket W4.

In February 2016, Hornby Railways also discussed how the first batch of liveries were painted: Dodo (563 of 1893) was painted the default light green used by Peckett and Sons (unless the customer specified otherwise). No. 11 of the Manchester Ship Canal (654 of 1897) was painted a dark green, while Huntley and Palmer's 'D' (832 of 1900) is painted in that company's lined blue livery. Now Hornby are releasing a model of the preserved locomotive Bear that is at the S&KLR in a questionable condition.

References

0-4-0ST locomotives
W4
Standard gauge steam locomotives of Great Britain